Al-Ziyarah Subdistrict is a Syrian nahiyah (subdistrict) located in Al-Suqaylabiyah District in Hama.  According to the Syria Central Bureau of Statistics (CBS), al-Ziyarah Subdistrict had a population of 38,872 in the 2004 census. The subdistrict is named after the town of al-Ziyarah, and its biggest town is Qastun.

References 

Ziyarah
Al-Suqaylabiyah District